Quva (Uzbek: Quva/Қува, قباء; Tajik: Фарғона, Persian: قباء Quva; Russian: Кува) is the capital of Quva District in eastern Uzbekistan. Quva is about 450 km east of Tashkent, about 46 km west of Andijan, and less than 17 km from the Kyrgyzstan border. Its population is 46,400 (2016).

Quva is motherland of Abū al-ʿAbbās Aḥmad ibn Muḥammad ibn Kathīr al-Farghānī, (800/805–870) also known as Alfraganus in the West, was an astronomer in the Abbasid court in Baghdad, and one of the most famous astronomers in the 9th century. The lunar crater Alfraganus is named after him.

Quva also famous with its fruits pomegranates, cherries and peaches. In addition, there is a big water reservoir ''Karkidon',' translated means hippopotamus and South Ferghana Canal in the territory of Quva. Neighbouring with the Marhamat district of Andijan region.

Kuva district is an administrative unit, the easternmost region of the Ferghana region of Uzbekistan. The administrative center is the city of Kuva. The district was formed as part of the Uzbek SSR on September 29, 1926. Since 1939, the village became the district center, and now the city of Kuva, which arose on the site of the ancient Buddhist and then the Muslim center of Qubo.

The total area of the district is 437 km2. In the west and south-west it borders with Ferghana, in the north-west - with Tashlak districts of the Ferghana region, in the north - with Boz, in the east - with the Marhamat districts of Andijan region of Uzbekistan, in the south and southeast - with Osh region of Kyrgyzstan. In terms of population density, the district exceeds the national average. The population in 2004 was about 186,400 people (62.58% of the total population are women). Among the nationalities, the majority are Uzbeks, Tajiks, Tatars, Russians and others.

History 

The mediaeval city was known as Cuba City, according to the studies focused on Arab written documents dating from the VII to X centuries. It was located along the old caravan road linking Kashgar and the Fergana Valley. Once Cuba was the second-largest of its kind in the area after the ancient Ferghana Valley capital, Ahsiket, but in the late 13th century the Mongolian invasion ruined the city.

The old town was composed of three parts: the citadel, the shahhristan and the rabbit (residential part of the city). The Middle Ages in the Fergana Valley, where Kuva had developed craft, especially pottery and gold-work, metal treatment, was a major economic and political part in the region. 

The first archaeological studies in the town began as early as the 1950s when the Major Fergana Canal was constructed, but in the 1956-1957 expedition the greatest achievement was found.

References

Populated places in Fergana Region
Cities in Uzbekistan